St Leonard's-in-the-Fields is a Church of Scotland church in Perth, Perth and Kinross, Scotland. Standing on Marshall Place, at its junction with Scott Street, overlooking the northern end of the South Inch, it was built between 1882 and 1885, to a design by J. J. Stevenson, and is now a Category A listed building. It is in the Gothic Revival style. Perth photographer Magnus Jackson had a wooden studio on the site between the 1850s and 1884.

Inside, the semi-octagonal apse was inspired by the 15th-century apse of the Church of the Holy Rude in Stirling.

The organ is by Perth native Henry Bryceson's company of London and dates to 1881. It was built for the former Morningside United Presbyterian Church and moved here in 1985, installed in a modern ash case.

Gallery

See also
List of Category A listed buildings in Perth and Kinross
List of listed buildings in Perth, Scotland

References

External links

St Leonard's-in-the-Fields – Scotland's Churches Trust

Category A listed buildings in Perth and Kinross
Leonard's-in-the-Fields
Churches completed in 1885
Leonard's-in-the-Fields
Listed churches in Scotland
Listed buildings in Perth, Scotland